Euchromius viettei is a species of moth in the family Crambidae. It is found in the desert belt from Chad to Oman.

The length of the forewings is about 14 mm. The groundcolour of the forewings is creamy white, densely suffused with ochreous to dark brown scales. The hindwings are grey to light brown with a darkly bordered termen.

References

Moths described in 1961
Crambinae
Moths of Africa